The 1992 United States Senate special election in North Dakota was held on December 4, 1992, to fill the United States Senate seat vacated by the late Quentin Burdick. Burdick's widow, Jocelyn Burdick, was appointed as a temporary replacement until the election was held. Democratic-NPL nominee Kent Conrad, who held North Dakota's other senate seat since 1986, had not run for re-election to his own seat, holding himself to a campaign promise pledging to reduce the federal deficit. Conrad won the election.

Major candidates

Democratic-NPL
 Kent Conrad, U.S. Senator

Republican
 Jack Dalrymple, State Representative

Campaign
Burdick's death provided an opportunity for Conrad to return to the Senate in a fight for an open seat. However, some, particularly his political opponents, saw this as a breach of his promise in spirit if not letter, Conrad's high approval ratings as Senator carried through to a victory against Republican state legislator Jack Dalrymple.

Results

See also
 1992 United States Senate elections

References

External links
 1992 Special North Dakota U.S. Senate Election results

North Dakota
1992
North Dakota 1992
1992 North Dakota elections
North Dakota 1992
United States Senate 1992